Shonda Stanton is an American softball coach who is the current head coach at Indiana.

Coaching career

Indiana
On June 10, 2017, Shonda Stanton was announced as the new head coach of the Indiana softball program, replacing Michelle Gardner.

Head coaching record

College
References:

References

Female sports coaches
American softball coaches
Marshall Thundering Herd softball coaches
Living people
Year of birth missing (living people)
Indiana Hoosiers softball coaches
IUPUI Jaguars softball coaches
Ashland Eagles softball coaches
UNC Greensboro Spartans softball players